Adelphi (from the Greek ἀδελφοί adelphoi, meaning "brothers") is a district of the City of Westminster in London. The small district includes the streets of Adelphi Terrace, Robert Street and John Adam Street. Of rare use colloquially, Adelphi is grouped with Aldwych as the greater Strand district (a main street of London between the two areas and those immediately adjoining) which for many decades formed a parliamentary constituency and civil registration district.

Adelphi Buildings

The district is named after the Adelphi Buildings, a block of 24 unified neoclassical terrace houses that occupied the land between The Strand and the River Thames in the parish of St Martin in the Fields, which also included a headquarters building for the "Society for the Encouragement of Arts, Manufactures and Commerce" (now generally known as the Royal Society of Arts). They were built between 1768 and 1772 by the Adam brothers (John, Robert, James and William Adam), to whom the buildings' Greek-derived name refers. The ruins of Durham House on the site were demolished for their construction.

Robert Adam was influenced by his extensive visit to Diocletian's Palace in Split, Croatia (previously Dalmatia), and he applied some of this influence to the design of the neoclassical Adelphi Buildings. The nearby Adelphi Theatre is named after the Adelphi Buildings.

Many of the Adelphi Buildings were demolished in the early 1930s and replaced with the New Adelphi, a monumental Art Deco building designed by the firm of Collcutt & Hamp. Buildings remaining from the old Adelphi include 11 Adelphi Terrace (formerly occupied by numismatic specialists A.H. Baldwin & Sons Ltd) and the Royal Society of Arts headquarters (which has expanded to incorporate two of the former houses). Benjamin Pollock's Toy Shop was located here in the 1940s.

Notable residents

South Australian Colonization Commission
The South Australian Colonization Commission (1834–1843) had their offices at 6 Adelphi Terrace in 1840. Rowland Hill was secretary to this body, and it was during this period that he devised his penny postage scheme.

London School of Economics
The London School of Economics (LSE) held its first classes in October 1895, in rooms at 9 John Street, Adelphi, before setting up more permanent operations in Number 10 Adelphi Terrace. By 1920, the LSE had moved a few blocks east, to its current Clare Market address. While in Adelphi, the LSE’s scholars and students were active in the surrounding neighbourhood and community.

Street name etymologies

Adelphi has no formally defined boundaries, though they are generally agreed to be: Strand to the north, Lancaster Place to the east, Victoria Embankment to the south and Charing Cross station to the west. The small set of streets east of Northumberland Avenue are included here for convenience.

Several streets are or were named using the words George Villiers, Duke of Buckingham after the first Duke, 17th century courtier, who acquired York House which formerly stood on this site; his son sold the area to developers on condition that his father and titles were commemorated on the new streets.

 Adam Street – after John and Robert Adam, who built the Adelphi development in the 1760s
 Adelphi Terrace – the area was developed by the brothers John and Robert Adam, in the 1760s, and was named after adelphos, the Greek for 'brother'
 The Arches – presumably descriptive, after the railway arches here
 Buckingham Arcade and Buckingham Street – after George Villiers, 1st Duke of Buckingham
 Carting Lane – thought to be from the carts that brought good to and from the wharf formerly located here; until the 1830s it was called Dirty Lane
 Charing Cross – after the Eleanor cross at Charing, from the Old English word "cierring", referring to a bend in the River Thames
 Corner House Street – unknown
 Craven Passage and Craven Street – after William Craven, 3rd Baron Craven, who owned the land when the street was built in the 1730s
 Durham House Street – this was the former site of Durham House, a palace belonging to the bishops of Durham in medieval times
 Embankment Place – after the Thames Embankment, built in the Victorian era
 George Court – after George Villiers, 1st Duke of Buckingham
 Hungerford Lane – after the Hungerford family, who owned a house on this site in the 15th century, later sold due to debts to create Hungerford Market, before the building of Charing Cross station
 Ivybridge Lane – named after a former ivy-covered bridge that crossed an old watercourse on this spot; the bridge was demolished sometime before 1600
 John Adam Street – after John Adam, who built the Adelphi development with his brother Robert in the 1760s, a combination of the previous John Street and Duke Street with the latter named after the 1st Duke of Buckingham
 Lancaster Place – former site of the Savoy Palace. It passed into the ownership of the earls of Lancaster in the 13th century, the most famous of which was John of Gaunt, who owned the palace at the times of its destruction in Peasant’s Revolt of 1381
Northumberland Avenue and Northumberland Street – site of the former Northumberland House, built originally in the early 17th century for the earls of Northampton and later acquired by the earls of Northumberland
 Robert Street and Lower Robert Street – after Robert Adam, who built the Adelphi development with his brother John in the 1760s
 Savoy Buildings, Savoy Court, Savoy Hill, Savoy Place, Savoy Row, Savoy Steps, Savoy Street and Savoy Way – the former site of the Savoy Palace, built for Peter II, Count of Savoy in 1245
 Strand and Strand Lane – from Old English 'stond', meaning the edge of a river; the river Thames formerly reached here prior to the building of the Thames Embankment
 Victoria Embankment – after Queen Victoria, reigning queen at the time of the building of the Thames Embankment
 Villiers Street – after George Villiers, 1st Duke of Buckingham
 Watergate Walk – after a former watergate built in 1626 for George Villiers, 1st Duke of Buckingham as an entrance for the former York House
 York Buildings and York Place – a house was built on this site in the 14th century for the bishops of Norwich – in the reign of Queen Mary it was acquired by the archbishops of York and named 'York House'; York Place was formerly 'Of Alley', after the 1st Duke of Buckingham

Notable residents
Sir J. M. Barrie (1860–1937), playwright and novelist, author of Peter Pan, at Adelphi Terrace
Edward Litt Laman Blanchard, writer, lived in Adelphi Terrace from 1876 to 1889
Charles Booth, shipyard owner, philanthropist and author
Richard D'Oyly Carte, Victorian impresario
John Galsworthy, novelist, author of The Forsyte Saga
David Garrick lived for his final seven years, and died in 1779, in the centre house of the buildings (no. 5)
James Graham, electrical quack sexologist, lived at 4 Adelphi Terrace from 1778 to 1781, opening his Temple of Health there in 1780
Thomas Hardy, English novelist
Thomas Monro, physician to George III and art patron, owned a house in Adelphi Terrace
George Bernard Shaw, Irish playwright, Fabian socialist, co-founder of the London School of Economics and Political Science (LSE)

In media 
 David Copperfield, created by Charles Dickens, lived on Buckingham Street in Adelphi.
 Fictional detective Gideon Fell, created by John Dickson Carr, lived at no. 1, Adelphi Terrace.
 The 1930s Adelphi building was used for some scenes in ITV's Agatha Christie's Poirot episode "The Theft of the Royal Ruby", and in episode "The Plymouth Express".
 In an instalment of E.M. Delafield’s semi-autobiographical Diary of a Provincial Lady series, entitled ‘The Provincial Lady in Wartime, the eponymous protagonist works in the canteen of an air raid shelter located under the Adelphi during the Phoney War. Much of the narrative is dedicated to describing the atmosphere and inhabitants of the building and the surrounding area, and many of the events of the book take place here.

See also 
 List of demolished buildings and structures in London

References

Further reading
 Brereton, Austin. The literary history of the Adelphi and its neighbourhood (New York: Duffield, 1909). Illustrated.

Housing in London
Robert Adam buildings
Areas of London
Districts of the City of Westminster
Georgian architecture in the City of Westminster
City of Westminster